Fresh Pond may refer to:

USA
Fresh Pond, California, an unincorporated town
Fresh Pond (Cambridge, Massachusetts), a reservoir and park
Fresh Pond Hotel
Fresh Pond Parkway
Fresh Pond (Plymouth, Massachusetts), a pond
Fresh Ponds, New Jersey, an unincorporated community
Fresh Pond, Queens, New York, a neighborhood
The Fresh Pond Bus Depot

Sint Maarten
Fresh Pond, Sint Maarten